Hakuna Matoma is the debut studio album by DJ and record producer Matoma. It was released on 13 November 2015 through Warner Music Group. It features collaborations and vocals from the likes of Becky Hill, Dua Lipa, Christopher, Sean Paul, KStewart, Coldplay, Astrid S, Popcaan, Wale, Akon, Madcon, Frenship, Dboy, Jason Derulo, Jennifer Lopez, Nico & Vinz, One Direction, The Notorious B.I.G., Ralph Tresvant and Ja Rule.

Singles
"Old Thing Back" was released as the album's lead single on 30 April 2015. The track is a remix offeatures vocals from American rapper The Notorious B.I.G., along with singers Ralph Tresvant and Ja Rule.

"Running Out" featuring Astrid S was released on 1 December 2016 as the album's third single. Its accompanying music video was released on 31 March 2016.

"False Alarm" was released on 24 June 2016 as the seventh single from the album. It features vocals by English singer-songwriter Becky Hill. The song marked Matoma's first UK Top 40 entry and Hill's third, peaking at number 28.

Promotional singles
In order to promote the album, Matoma released a series of promotional singles throughout a year before its release, the first one, "Feeling Right (Everything Is Nice)" was released on 12 October 2015. It features American rapper Wale and Jamaican recording artist Popcaan.

"Find Love" featuring music group Dboy, "Knives" featuring American electronic duo Frenship, "Love You Right" featuring fellow Norwegian duo Nico & Vinz and "The Wave" featuring Norwegian duo Madcon, were all simultaneously released on 12 November 2015 as the next four promotional singles from the album. The songs were first uploaded to Matoma's YouTube channel and made available for purchase and streaming the next day.

Other songs 
The album features Wonderful Life (Mi Oh My), a track made for the Angry Birds Movie soundtrack. As well as remixes of Dua Lipa's "Hotter Than Hell", Coldplay's "Adventure of A Lifetime", One Direction's "Perfect", Astrid S' "2AM", and an acoustic version of "False Alarm".

Track listing

References

 

2015 debut albums
Matoma albums
Albums produced by MNEK